Propotamochoerus is an extinct genus of pig-like animals that lived from Miocene to Pliocene of Algeria, India, Moldova, China, Russia, Ukraine, Georgia, Greece, Hungary, Myanmar, Thailand, Tunisia and Pakistan.

References
Propotamochoerus at fossilworks

Suinae
Prehistoric Suidae
Miocene even-toed ungulates
Pliocene even-toed ungulates
Fossil taxa described in 1925
Prehistoric even-toed ungulate genera